Eddie Russ (born March 20, 1987) is a former Canadian football defensive back who played for the Saskatchewan Roughriders of the Canadian Football League (CFL). He started 21 games and made 53 tackles, 11 pass deflections and one interception in his career.

References

Saskatchewan Roughriders players
Canadian football defensive backs
Harding Bisons football players
1987 births
Living people